The State Russian Drama Theatre named after Pushkin or Pushkin Theatre  is a theatre in Ashgabat, the capital city of Turkmenistan.

History 
The theatre was founded in 1926. In 1957, the theatre was named after Russian poet Alexander Pushkin. In February 2004, building on the Görogly street was demolished, because of its state of emergency. The theatre was moved to Magyumguly avenue, to the building of the former Palace of Culture of the Ashgabat Silk Factory.

References

Links 
 

Theatres in Ashgabat
Theatres completed in 1926